Spengelidae is a family of worms belonging to the class Enteropneusta, order unknown.

Genera:
 Glandiceps Spengel, 1891
 Mazoglossus Bardack, 1997
 Schizocardium Spengel, 1893
 Spengelia Willey, 1898
 Willeyia Punnett, 1903

References

Enteropneusta